Liridona Syla (born 5 February 1986) is a Kosovan professional footballer who plays as a defender for Kosovan club Mitrovica and the Kosovo national team.

Club career

Hajvalia

2016–17 season
Syla opened the 2017–18 season by playing in the qualifying round in the 2016–17 UEFA Women's Champions League, she played in the opening game of the 2016–17 UEFA Women's Champions League campaign against PAOK in a 1–1 draw.

International career
On 27 February 2017, Syla was named as part of the Kosovo squad for 2017 Turkish Women's Cup. On 1 March 2017, she made his debut with Kosovo in a match against Poland after coming on as a substitute.

International goals 

|-
|1.
|
|Fadil Vokrri Stadium, Pristina, Kosovo
|
|align="center"|2–0
|align="center"|2–0
|align="center"|UEFA Women's Euro 2021 qualifying
|align="center"|
|-
| 2. || 11 April 2021 || Petar Miloševski Training Centre, Skopje, North Macedonia ||  || align=center|1–0 || align=center| 1–0 || Friendly
|-
| 3. || 26 October 2021 || Vazgen Sargsyan Republican Stadium, Yerevan, Armenia ||  || align=center|1–0 || align=center| 1–0 || rowspan=2| 2023 FIFA Women's World Cup qualification || 
|-
| 4. || 25 November 2021 || Fadil Vokrri Stadium, Pristina, Kosovo ||  || align=center|1–0 || align=center| 1–2 || 
|-
|}

See also
List of Kosovo women's international footballers

References

External links

1986 births
Living people
Sportspeople from Skenderaj
Women's association football defenders
Kosovan women's footballers
Kosovo women's international footballers
KFF Mitrovica players
KFF Hajvalia players